In geometry, a supporting hyperplane of a set  in Euclidean space  is a hyperplane that has both of the following two properties:
  is entirely contained in one of the two closed half-spaces bounded by the hyperplane,
  has at least one boundary-point on the hyperplane.
Here, a closed half-space is the half-space that includes the points within the hyperplane.

Supporting hyperplane theorem

defines a supporting hyperplane.

Conversely, if  is a closed set with nonempty interior such that every point on the boundary has a supporting hyperplane, then  is a convex set, and is the intersection of all its supporting closed half-spaces.

The hyperplane in the theorem may not be unique, as noticed in the second picture on the right.

The supporting hyperplanes of convex sets are also called tac-planes or tac-hyperplanes.

The forward direction can be proved as a special case of the separating hyperplane theorem (see the page for the proof). For the converse direction,

See also

 Support function
 Supporting line (supporting hyperplanes in )

Notes

References & further reading 

Convex geometry
Functional analysis
Duality theories